Jaroslav Chalupský is a Czech Svobodní politician who serves as Senator representing Pelhřimov. He became senator in 2020 after he narrowly beat Milan Štěch. He then joined ODS-TOP 09 Senate caucus.

References

1974 births
Svobodní Senators
Living people
Czech politicians
People from Jindřichův Hradec
Prague University of Economics and Business alumni